The Lockheed X-17 was a three-stage solid-fuel research rocket to test the effects of high mach atmospheric reentry. The first stage of the X-17 carried the rocket to a height of  before burning out. The rocket would then coast on momentum to about  before nosing down for reentry. The second stage engine would then fire before jettisoning and igniting the third and final stage. Ultimately the X-17 would be traveling towards Earth at up to Mach 14.5.

The X-17 was also used as the booster for the Operation Argus series of three high-altitude nuclear tests conducted in the South Atlantic in 1958.

The rocket engine used by the rocket is called 1.5KS35000, a solid propellant rocket engine designed by Thiokol. It was used in at least 23 launches.

Polaris FTV program

The X-17 was used as a test vehicle to test technology for the development of the UGM-27 Polaris missile in 1957–1958. During this testing, the rocket was called the Polaris Flight Test Vehicle, or Polaris FTV. The Polaris FTV-3 was a standard configuration X-17. The Polaris FTV-5 was a two-stage configuration using the same first stage, a Sergeant rocket, with a different second stage.

References

External links

 
 X-17 History
 X-17 Specs

X-17
Lockheed Corporation